Anamnesis  may refer to:

 Anamnesis (Christianity), a Christian concept involved in the Eucharist
 Medical history, information gained by a physician by asking specific questions of a patient
 "Anamnesis" (Millennium), a 1998 television episode
 Anamnesis (philosophy), a concept in Plato's epistemological and psychological theory